Trương Quang Được (10 February 1940 – 27 October 2016) was a senior Vietnamese politician. Despite already being a member of Vietnam's Politburo he was additionally appointed Vice-Chairman of Vietnam's National Assembly in 2003.

References

1940 births
2016 deaths
Members of the 9th Politburo of the Communist Party of Vietnam
Members of the 7th Central Committee of the Communist Party of Vietnam
Members of the 8th Central Committee of the Communist Party of Vietnam
Members of the 9th Central Committee of the Communist Party of Vietnam